Montello station is an MBTA Commuter Rail station in Brockton, Massachusetts. It serves the Middleborough/Lakeville Line. Located north of downtown Brockton, it has two full-length high-level platforms serving the line's two tracks, and is fully accessible.

History

The station opened on September 29, 1997, along with the rest of the Old Colony Lines service. A New Haven Railroad station was located at Montello on the Middleborough Main Line until the Old Colony Division closed in 1959. It was renamed from Huntington Heights on January 15, 1885.

References

External links

MBTA - Montello
Station from SPARK Street from Google Maps Street View

Stations along Old Colony Railroad lines
MBTA Commuter Rail stations in Plymouth County, Massachusetts
Railway stations in the United States opened in 1997